Laurina “Lauchi” Oliveros (born 10 September 1993) is an Argentine footballer who plays as a goalkeeper for Boca Juniors and the Argentina women's national team.

Early life
Oliveros lived in Venice, Florida, United States during her childhood.

International career
Oliveros represented Argentina at the 2010 South American U-17 Women's Championship and the 2012 FIFA U-20 Women's World Cup. At senior level, she received her first international call-up in 2011, but always remained as the second or the third choice for the Argentine goal, being initially Elisabeth Minnig and more recently Vanina Correa the ones who played the matches. Oliveros was a part of the Argentine squads which competed at the 2011 Pan American Games and two Copa América Femenina editions (2014 and 2018). She made her debut on 3 March 2019 as a second half substitution (for Correa) in a 0–2 friendly loss against New Zealand.

Honours and achievements

Club
UAI Urquiza 
Torneo Clausura: 2012
Torneo Final: 2014
Primera A: 2016, 2017–18

Personal life
Oliveros is a supporter of River Plate.

References

1993 births
Living people
Women's association football goalkeepers
Argentine women's footballers
Sportspeople from Buenos Aires Province
Argentina women's international footballers
Pan American Games competitors for Argentina
Footballers at the 2011 Pan American Games
UAI Urquiza (women) players
Santiago Morning footballers
Argentine expatriate women's footballers
Argentine expatriate sportspeople in Chile
Expatriate women's footballers in Chile
21st-century Argentine women